Myachikovo is a rural locality (a village) in Nagornoye Rural Settlement, Petushinsky District, Vladimir Oblast, Russia. The population was 28 as of 2010.

Geography 
Myachikovo is located 40 km northwest of Petushki (the district's administrative centre) by road. Abrosovo is the nearest rural locality.

References 

Rural localities in Petushinsky District